The Philippines had participated in the 24th Southeast Asian Games was held in the city of Nakhon Ratchasima from 6 to 15 December 2007. The country has a delegation of 620 athletes, who participated in 41 different events.

The delegation was placed 6th overall, the lowest windup of the country in the history of SEA Games since its entry in 1977. However, 4-time swimming gold medallist Miguel Molina was named the Most Valuable Male Player of the 2007 SEA Games, the third Filipino (and also the third Filipino swimmer) to bag the major award for outstanding SEA Games performance after Akiko Thomson in 1989 Kuala Lumpur Games and Eric Buhain in the 1991 Manila Games.

Medalists

Gold

Silver

Bronze

Multiple

Medal summary

By sports

Other results
Events are arranged chronologically; sports are arranged alphabetically. Events that won medals are excluded. For events currently ongoing in which the Philippines is not yet eliminated, see ongoing, below.

Shooting
Women's 25M Pistol (individual)
14th – Susan Aguado
Women's 50M Rifle Prone (individual)
9th – Nicoli Medina
Men's 10M Air Pistol (individual)
12th – Carolino Gonzales
Men's 10M Air Rifle (team)
4th – Philippines (Emerito Concepcion, Daryl Sandoval, Alfonso Hermoso)
Men's 50M Air Pistol (individual)
14th – Carolino Gonzales
Men's 25M Standard Pistol (individual)
5th – Tac Padilla
13th – Robert Donalvo
14th – Carolino Gonzales
Men's 25M Standard Pistol (team)
4th – Philippines (Nathaniel Padilla, Robert Donalvo, Carolino Gonzales)
Women's 10m Air Pistol (Individual)
12th – Susan Agualdo
Men's 50M Rifle Prone (team)
6th – Philippines (Eddie Tomas, Edwin Fernandez, Rocky Pardilla)
Men's 50M Rifle Prone (individual)
13th – Eddie Tomas
15th – Edwin Fernandez
18th – Rocky Pardilla
Men's 25M Rapid Prone (individual)
12th – Tac Padilla
13th – Robert Donalvo
Men's 25M Center Fire Pistol (team)
4th – Philippines (Nathaniel Padilla, Robert Donalvo, Carolino Gonzales)
Men's 25M Center Fire Pistol (individual)
7th – Tac Padilla
13th – Carolino Gonzales
14th – Roberto Donalvo
Men's 50M Rifle 3 position (individual)
9th – Rocky Pardill
10th – Edwin Fernandez
12th – Eddie Tomas
Men's 50M Rifle 3 position (team)
4th – Philippines (Rocky Pardilla, Edwin Fernandez, Eddie Tomas)
Men's Skeet (individual)
Tied-5th – Paul Brian Rosario
7th – Patricio Bernardo
8th – Gabriel Tong

Table tennis
Women's team:
Indonesia  def.  Philippines, 3-1
Ceria Nilasari (INA) def Andrea Balatbat (PHI) 3-1
Crisanta Abas (PHI) def Christine Ferliana (INA) 3-1
Nuni Sugiani (INA) def Ian Lariba (PHI) 3-0
Christine Ferliana (INA) def Andrea Balatbat (PHI) 3-0
Vietnam  def.  Philippines, 3-0
Mai Hoang my Thrang (VIE) def Crisanta Abas (PHI) 3-0
Mai Xuan Hang (VIE) def Andrea Balatbat (PHI) 3-0
Luong Thi Tam (VIE) def Ian Lariba (PHI) 3-0
Thailand  def.  Philippines, 3-0
Nanthana Komwong (THA) def Andrea Balatbat (PHI) 3-0
Anisara Munagsuk (THA) def Crisanta Abas (PHI) 3-0
Priyakan Triampo (THA) def Ian Lariba (PHI) 3-1
Men's team
Philippines  def.  Cambodia, 3-0
Richard Gonzales (PHI) def Boroath Sam (CAM) 3-0
Julius Esposo (PHI) def Sovathanak Hout (CAM) 3-0
Henberd Ortalla (PHI) def Roathana Sun (CAM) 3-0
Singapore  def.  Philippines, 3-0
Gao Ning (SIN) def Henberd Ortalla (PHI) 3-0
Yang Zi (SIN) def Richard Gonzales (PHI) 3-1
Cai Xiaoli (SIN) def Rodel Ireneo Valle (PHI) 3-0
Thailand  def.  Philippines, 3-0
Phakpoom Sanguansin (THA) def Richard Gonzales (PHI) 3-0
Phuchong Sanguansin (THA) def Henberd Ortalla (PHI) 3-1
Chaisit Chaitat (THA) def Julius Esposo (PHI) 3-1

Ongoing

These events are either currently ongoing or to be held, no medals are awarded yet and the Philippines is still in contention:

Men's Basketball

Results

Pool stage:  82-136 
Pool stage:  49-75 
Pool stage:  60-180 
Pool stage:  53-94

Women's Basketball

Results

Pool stage:  55-67 
Pool stage:  70-54 
Pool stage:  74-56

Football (soccer)
Women:
Group A:  2-2  (Goal scorers: Patrice Impelido (48'), Edna Agravante (50'))
Group A:  10-0

References

Southeast Asian Games
Nations at the 2007 Southeast Asian Games
2007